Cecilie Benedicte Torhaug (born 27 July 1969) is a Norwegian curler. She won bronze medals at the 1993 and 1995 World Curling Championships.

References

External links
 

1969 births
Living people
Norwegian female curlers
European curling champions